WWHR-FM (91.7 FM) is a radio station licensed to Bowling Green, Kentucky, United States, and in turn, serves within the area. The station is currently owned by Western Kentucky University.

History

WWHR-FM signed on in the fall of 1988, under the name New Rock 92 managed by associate professor Bart White. The station served primarily as an academic broadcasting lab housed in the Academic Complex transmitting from the residence hall Pearce-Ford Tower with 100 watts of power. New Rock 92's signal covered a five-mile radius.

This changed in 2001 when broadcasting instructor, Dr. Marjorie Yambor, became general manager of the station. Dr. Yambor transformed the simple broadcast lab into a full-fledged competitive station. This began by rebranding the station as Revolution 91.7, along with newly constructed studio spaces, a new tower and a boost in effective radiated power to 1,300 watts, expanding the station's broadcast radius to about thirty miles. Following the transmitter upgrade in 2002, WWHR began a 24-hour programming schedule (with the exception of winter breaks and technical issues)

In 2015, Yambor left the position of General Manager. While the University searched for a replacement, broadcasting instructors Victoria LaPoe and Jeanine Cherry fulfilled interim management duties alongside student managers Angela Conway and Taylor Hodgkins overseeing day-to-day operations.

In 2016, former Nashville Public Radio employee Emil Moffat was named General Manager fulfilling the management duties for both WWHR and WKYU-FM.

WWHR switched to a Triple A format in late 2017, coinciding with new on-air branding and an updated logo.

Annual events

Each year, Revolution 91.7 brings two charity music festivals to Bowling Green. During the fall semester, Revolution 91.7 presents RevFest - an on-campus music festival and competition featuring various musical acts in the community. The station also hosts another festival in the spring known as Mayhem. Unlike RevFest, it is held off-campus and usually features bigger names in the local and regional area as well as a national scale headliner. Many businesses in the area and organizations also attend, featuring booths in support of the event, or offering of goods and services.

Programming
The programming at Revolution 91.7 is well known for its diversity. Music selections are made by the student operators and directors considering current popular college radio selections as well as local bands and student preferences. In addition to providing music throughout the day, Revolution 91.7 also offers News and Sports programming along with Student-conceived genre specific specialty shows every evening from 10 pm to Midnight Central Time.

Specialty programming
 Glory Days - Tuesday 10pm to Midnight - Classic Rock - Hosted by Uncle Sam, Big K and NattieLite
 World Wide Rev - Sunday 10 pm to Midnight - World Music - Hosted by Bean
 Local Shots - Wednesday 10 pm to Midnight - Local Music/Regional - Hosted by Night Owl *
 EDM NRG - Thursday 10 pm to Midnight - Electronic (various sub-genres) - Hosted by Dharma *
 Decades of Aggression - Friday 10 pm to Midnight - Heavy Metal/Hardcore - Hosted by Duffy
 Drop the Aux - Saturday 10 pm to Midnight - Alternative Rap/Hiphop - Hosted by Jamrock

"*" denotes a program returning from the previous year.

In addition to specialty show programming, WWHR also features specialty programming blocks:
 Flashback Fridays - Friday (throughout regular rotation) - Classic alternative music from 1967 to 2001
 The Weekend Grind - Thursdays, Fridays and Saturdays 8 to 10 pm - A vast array of remixes and electronic music

Holiday Rotation is also featured during Halloween and the Christmas seasons.

News and talk programming
Unlike the station's specialty programming, News and Talk programming is not hosted by the station's regular deejays. These programs are written, produced, and conducted by Broadcasting students of the university as class projects, allowing students of journalism and news to receive hands on experience in program production.

 News 91.7 - Weekdays at the bottom of the hours 7-10 am and 3-6 pm - News
 Revolution 91.7 Platform - Monday and Thursday 7 to 7:30 pm - Student life, Talk
 The Red Zone - Wednesday 6 to 7 pm - Sports analysis/forum

References

External links

WHR
WHR
Western Kentucky University
1988 establishments in Kentucky